Biddick Hall is a small privately owned 18th-century country mansion at Bournmoor, County Durham, near the City of Sunderland and Chester-le-Street. It is a Grade I listed building and the home of the Lambton family.

History

In the early 18th century the old manor was replaced with the present red brick and stone, two-storeyed, five-bay mansion in a Queen Anne Baroque style. The central entrance bay has Ionic order pilasters carrying entablature and pediment.

In about 1820 John George Lambton built Lambton Castle to the west on the adjoining Harraton Hall estate. He was created Baron Lambton in 1828 and Earl of Durham in 1833.

The Hall was extended by the creation of a fifth but blind bay in 1859 and the addition of a north wing in 1954.

Following the family's move to Lambton Castle, Biddick was occupied by junior members of the family or was let out. One of the tenants was Frank Stobart, Agent to the Earl, and Deputy Lieutenant and High Sheriff of Durham in 1906.

In 1932, the Castle being uninhabitable, the family once more made Biddick their home. It was remodelled by Trenwith Wills and Lord Gerald Wellesley.

In September 2012, Biddick Hall was used as part of the set of the new BBC One drama The Paradise.

Biddick Hall was used as a filming location for the 2015 movie Estranged. Shots of the exterior of Biddick Hall are frequently used throughout the film

References

  – architectural description
 An Historic Topographical and Descriptive View of the County of Durham Vol 1. McKenzie and Ross (1834) p361 Google Books

External links
Official website

Grade I listed buildings in County Durham